Clifford Brown and Max Roach at Basin Street (also known as At Basin Street) is a 1956 album by the Clifford Brown and Max Roach Quintet, the last album the quintet officially recorded. Apart from Sonny Rollins Plus 4, it was the last studio album Brown and pianist Richie Powell recorded before their deaths in June that year. The title is a reference to the Basin Street East jazz club, where the quintet had performed several times.

Track listing 
All tracks arranged by Richie Powell except 6.
 "What Is This Thing Called Love?" (Cole Porter) – 7:33
 "Love Is a Many-Splendored Thing" (Sammy Fain, Paul Francis Webster) – 4:13
 "I'll Remember April" (Gene de Paul, Patricia Johnston, Don Raye) – 9:13
 "Powell's Prances" (Richie Powell) – 3:28
 "Time" (Richie Powell) – 5:03
 "The Scene Is Clean" (Tadd Dameron, arr. Dameron) – 6:04
 "Gertrude's Bounce" (Richie Powell) – 4:09
 Bonus tracks included on the 2002 CD release:
 "Step Lightly (Junior's Arrival)" (Benny Golson) – 3:33
 "Flossie Lou" (Dameron) – 3:55
 "What Is This Thing Called Love? (alternate take)" – 8:18
 "Love Is a Many-Splendored Thing (breakdown)" – 0:45
 "Love Is a Many-Splendored Thing (alternate take)" – 3:53
 "I'll Remember April (breakdown)" – 1:25
 "I'll Remember April (alternate take)" – 9:42
 "Flossie Lou (alternate take)" – 4:00

Personnel 
 Clifford Brown - trumpet
 Sonny Rollins – tenor saxophone
 Richie Powell – piano, celesta
 George Morrow – double bass
 Max Roach – drums

Critical reception 
The album was identified by Scott Yanow in his AllMusic essay "Hard Bop" as one of the 17 Essential Hard Bop Recordings.

References 

Clifford Brown albums
Max Roach live albums
Albums produced by Bob Shad
EmArcy Records live albums
1956 live albums
Hard bop albums
Verve Records albums